Joseph ("Jos") Vissers (28 November 1928 – 18 April 2006) was a Belgian boxer who competed in the Lightweight division during his career.

Amateur career
Vissers was the Olympic Silver Medalist at lightweight in London in 1948, losing to Gerald Dreyer of South Africa in the final.

1948 Olympic results

Below are the results of Joseph Vissers, a Belgian lightweight boxer, who competed at the 1948 London Olympics:

 Round of 32: defeated Billy Barber (Australia) on points
 Round of 16: defeated Edy Schmidiger (Switzerland) on points
 Quarterfinal: defeated Eddie Haddad (Canada) on points
 Semifinal: defeated Wallace Smith (United States) on points
 Final: lost to Gerald Dreyer (South Africa) on points (was awarded the silver medal)

Pro career
Vissers turned pro in 1948 and fought primarily in Belgium, retiring in 1951 after an unsuccessful pro career, having won 5 and lost 6 with 3 KO.

External links
databaseOlympics

Obituary for Joe Vissers 

1928 births
2006 deaths
Lightweight boxers
Olympic boxers of Belgium
Boxers at the 1948 Summer Olympics
Olympic silver medalists for Belgium
Olympic medalists in boxing
Belgian male boxers
Medalists at the 1948 Summer Olympics